The 2011–12 DePaul Blue Demons men's basketball team represented DePaul University during the 2011–12 NCAA Division I men's basketball season. The Blue Demons, led by second year head coach Oliver Purnell, played their home games at the Allstate Arena, with three home games at McGrath-Phillips Arena, and were members of the Big East Conference. They finished the season 12–19, 3–15 in Big East play to finish in last place. They lost in the first round of the Big East tournament to Connecticut.

Preseason
On October 19, 2011, at Big East Media Day, DePaul was ranked last in the Big East Preseason Coaches' Poll, receiving 27 points.

Roster

Schedule

|-
!colspan=9| Exhibition

|-
!colspan=9| Regular season

|-
!colspan=9| 2012 Big East men's basketball tournament

References

DePaul Blue Demons men's basketball seasons
DePaul